Kevin Baron may refer to:

 Kevin Baron (footballer) (1926–1971), English professional footballer
 Kevin Baron (journalist) (born 1975), American journalist

See also
 Kevin Barron (born 1946), British Labour Party politician